Bishop McGuinness Catholic High School may refer to:

Bishop McGuinness Catholic High School (North Carolina), in Kernersville
Bishop McGuinness Catholic High School (Oklahoma), in Oklahoma City